This is a list of notable graduates, students who attended, and former faculty of Punahou School, a  private, co-educational, college preparatory school in Honolulu, Hawaii. An asterisk (*) indicates a person who attended Punahou but did not graduate with senior class. Parents and children of alumni are noted only if they have made significant achievements in the same field or activity.

Numerous athletic, educational, cultural, business, and government leaders of significance to the State of Hawaii have been excluded, as well as most University of Hawaii and other State of Hawaii educators, and Hawaii-based entertainers, and artists.

Olympic athletes, medalists and other world champions

Beach volleyball
 '90 Kevin Wong (UCLA)—2000
 '91 Stein Metzger (UCLA)—2004
 '10 Taylor Crabb (Long Beach State)—2021

Diving
 '69 Keala O'Sullivan (Hawaii)—1968 bronze medalist

Dressage (equestrian)
 '72* Sandy Pflueger—1984 (attended 1959–69)

Kayaking
 '92 Kathryn Colin (Washington)—2000, 2004
 '97 Andrew Bussey (UC Irvine)—2004

Sailing
 '66 David Rockwell McFaull (Cornell)—1976 silver medalist
 '72 Michael Jon Rothwell—1976 silver medalist
 '76 Keani Reiner

Surfing
 '10 Carissa Moore, first Olympic gold medal in women's short board surfing in 2020

Swimming

 '24* Mariechen Wehselau Jackson—1924 gold and silver medalist (attended 1912–23)
'24 Helen Moses
 '25* Warren Kealoha—1920 gold medalist (youngest male US gold in swimming), 1924 gold medalist (attended 1920–22)
 '27 Buster Crabbe (Southern Cal)—1928 bronze medalist, 1932 gold medalist (see also below)
 '47 Dick Cleveland (Hawaii, Ohio State)—1952, four-time world record holder, International Swimming Hall of Fame
 '67 Brent Thales Berk (Stanford)—1968
 '76 Chris Woo (Indiana)—1976
 2009 Christel Simms (USC)—2008

Volleyball
 '66 Miki Briggs McFadden (USC)—1968
 '92 Mike Lambert (Stanford)—1996, 2000
 '98 Lindsey Berg (Minnesota)—2004, 2008, and 2012 silver medalist
 2008 Erik Shoji (Stanford)—2016, 2020

Water polo
 '84 Christopher Duplanty (UC Irvine)—silver medalist 1988, 1992, 1996, 2000
 '97 Sean Kern (UCLA)—2000
 '99 Brandon Brooks  (UCLA)—2004, 2008 silver medalist

Track
 '72 Henry Marsh (BYU)—1976, 1980 team, 1984, 1988

Other world champion athletes and recent All-Americans
 '99 Elisa Au (Hawaii)—3-time World Karate Federation World Champion, Black Belt Magazine Hall of Fame, 2005 best amateur athlete, Sullivan Award finalist

Professional athletes

Football
 '27 Henry Thomas "Hank" "Honolulu" Hughes (Oregon State)—original Washington Redskins (Boston Braves) football player 1931-32 (10 games)
 '48 Herman Clark (Oregon State)—Chicago Bears offensive lineman 1952-57 (52 games) 
 '48 Jim Clark (Oregon State)—Washington Redskins offensive lineman 1952-53 (20 games) and Hawaii state senator
 '49 Charley Ane, Jr. (USC)—Detroit Lions offensive lineman 1953-59 (83 games), team captain for two NFL championships and two-time Pro Bowl selection
 '59* Ray Schoenke (Southern Methodist)—Dallas Cowboys and Washington Redskins offensive lineman 1963-75 (145 games), unsuccessful Democratic candidate for Maryland Governor, 1998, founding president of American Hunters and Shooters Association (attended 1956–58)
 '64 Norm Chow (Utah)—CFL player, former Tennessee Titans offensive coordinator, former University of Hawaiʻi at Mānoa head coach

 '71 Arnold Morgado, Jr. (Hawaii)—Kansas City Chiefs running back 1977-80 (52 games), city councilman
 '71 Charles "Kale" Ane III (Michigan State)—offensive lineman for Kansas City Chiefs and Green Bay Packers, 1975-1981 (105 games)
 '74 Mosi Tatupu (USC)—New England Patriots running back 1978-91 (199 games), one Super Bowl, one Pro Bowl, college football Mosi Tatupu Award, father of Lofa Tatupu
 '74 Keith Uperesa (BYU)—offensive lineman rostered by Oakland Raiders and Denver Broncos 1978-1979
 '78 Mark Tuinei (Hawaii)—Dallas Cowboys offensive lineman 1983-97 (195 games), two Pro Bowls and three Super Bowls
 '80 John Kamana III (USC)—Los Angeles Rams and Atlanta Falcons running back (5 games)
 2009 Manti Teʻo (Notre Dame)—signed by the San Diego Chargers, 2012 Heisman Trophy finalist
 2012 DeForest Buckner (Oregon)—NFL defensive tackle for the Indianapolis Colts, drafted by the San Francisco 49ers in 2016
 2012 Kaʻimi Fairbairn (UCLA)—NFL place kicker for the Houston Texans

Baseball
 '81* Joey Meyer, Jr. (Hawaii)—Milwaukee Brewers first baseman 1988-89 (156 games)
 '97 Justin Wayne (Stanford)—Florida Marlins pitcher 2002-04 (pitched in 26 games)
 '14 KJ Harrison

Volleyball

 '69 Linda Fernandez (Hawaii)—All-Pro 1976-79 for LA Stars, SB Spikers, and Seattle Smashers of International Volleyball Association; Superstars winner 1979 and 1980

Tennis
 '63 Jim Osborne (Utah)—5-time Grand Prix tennis circuit doubles winner

Golf
 '67 Penelope Gebauer (Boise State)—9-time LPGA top-10 finisher, founder of Women's Golf School
 '97 Parker McLachlin (UCLA)—winner on PGA Tour, 4-time top-10 finisher in 53 events (2001–2008)
 '99 Bridget Dwyer (UCLA)—#9 on LPGA Futures Tour, #2 on The Big Break VI
 2007 Michelle Wie (Stanford)—2-time LPGA winner, winning Solheim Cup team member, 36-time top-10 finisher

Surfing
 '65 Fred Hemmings, Jr.—1968 world surfing champion, Hawaii state senator, Republican minority leader
 '66 Gerry Lopez—1972 and 1973 Pipeline Masters champion (see also below)
 '67 Jeff Hakman—1974 and 1975 world surfing champion and founder of Quiksilver (see also below)
 '10 Carissa Moore—2011 ASP Women's World Tour Champion; multiple ASP Elite victories; 2010 ASP Rookie of the Year and 11 National Scholastic Surfing Association (NSSA) titles; 2020 gold medalist

Mixed martial arts
 '09 Ilima-Lei Macfarlane—professional mixed martial artist, inaugural and former Bellator MMA Flyweight Champion

Leading medical doctors

Professional society and government leaders
 '27 Rodney T. West (Northwestern)—Naval Reserve MD at Attack on Pearl Harbor and founding president of American College of Physician Executives
 '32 Colin McCorriston (Stanford)—one of the founders of American College of Obstetricians and Gynecologists
 '32 John Iorwerth Reppun (Harvard)—one of the organizers of Physicians for Social Responsibility
 '45 Calvin C.J. Sia (Dartmouth)—developer and leading advocate of the nationwide Medical Home concept for pediatric care and federal Emergency Medical Services for Children program
 '45* William L. Morgan (Yale)—Master of the American College of Physicians, Clinical Approach to the Patient, William L. Morgan Professorship in Medicine (University of Rochester) (attended 1939–44)
 '50 Richard Ikeda (Harvard)—chief medical consultant to Medical Board of California 
 '53 Carol Kasper (Chicago)—emerita professor of medicine at USC; VP of World Federation of Hemophilia
 '56 Anne Angen Gershon (Smith)—professor of pediatrics at Columbia U, president of Infectious Diseases Society of America
 '57 Darwin R. Labarthe (Princeton)—professor of epidemiology at U Texas, director of Division for Heart Disease and Stroke Prevention, CDC
 '62 Ernest T. Takafuji (UH)—colonel and director of biodefense at National Institute of Allergy and Infectious Diseases, director of Walter Reed Army Institute of Research

Other prominently published medical researchers and research faculty
 '53 John Maesaka (Harvard)—emeritus director of nephrology at Long Island Jewish Medical Center and Winthrop University
 '63 William R. Sexson (Air Force Academy)—clinical dean and professor of pediatrics at Emory
 '69 Dale T. Umetsu (Columbia)—endowed professor of pediatrics at Harvard
 '71 Jan H. Wong (Stanford)—professor of surgery at UCLA
 '79 Theodore R. Cummins (Swarthmore)—professor of pharmacology and toxicology at Indiana
 '79 Mahesh Mankani (Stanford)—professor of surgery at UCSF
 '79 Arno J. Mundt (Stanford)—chair of radiation oncology at UCSD
 '79 Annabelle A. Okada (Harvard)—Fulbright Scholar, professor of medicine at Kyorin U (Tokyo), Practical Manual of Ocular Inflammation
 '79 Leanne Brooks Scott (Rice)—dean of research at Baylor College of Medicine
 '79 Karen K. Takane (Michigan)—research professor of medicine at U Pittsburgh
 '79 Hal F. Yee (Brown)—head of gastroenterology and interim chief of medicine at UCSF
 '79 Alan R. Yuen (Berkeley)—professor of medicine at Stanford Medical
 '80 Daniel C. Chung (Harvard)—professor of medicine at Harvard
 '84 Jason T. Kimata (Carleton)—professor of microbiology at Baylor

Other clinical faculty at top medical schools or clinically notable M.D.s
 '32 Andrew S. Wong (Yale)—clinical professor of ophthalmology at Yale
 '37* M. Neil MacIntyre (Michigan)—professor of anatomy and human genetics at Case Western (attended 1931–35)
 '50 Ray Maesaka (Harvard)—director of dentistry at Indiana, Maesaka Award (Indiana University School of Dentistry)
 '52 Wilfred Morioka (Princeton)—professor of surgery at UCSD, President of Otolaryngologic Society, and United States Navy Captain
 '64 Stephen W. Wongprofessor of ophthalmology at Temple
 '72 Nancy Morioka-Douglas (Stanford)—chief of family medicine at Stanford
 '77 Sidney Ontai (Harvard)—professor of family medicine at USC
 '78 Dimitri Voulgaropoulos (Harvard)—professor of anaesthesiology at Arizona
 '79 Scott Oishi (Washington University in St. Louis)—professor of surgery at University of Texas Southwestern Medical School
 '80 Elizabeth Blair (Creighton)—professor of surgery at U Chicago

Other leading educators and researchers

Administrators and general subjects
 '28* Arthur P. Richardson (Stanford)—Dean of Medical School at Emory (attended 1920–24)
 '40 Frederic B. Withington, Jr. (Harvard)—Headmaster at Morgan Park Academy and Friends Academy, Principal at Sidwell Friends School; Distinguished Flying Cross, Flight to Black Hammer
 '42 Pamela Lei Strathairn (Stanford)—associate director of athletics at Stanford, Strathairn Award
 '66* George Barnett Forsythe (West Point)—president of Westminster College (MO), brigadier general, academic dean of West Point US Military Academy (attended 63–65)
 '70 Robert Spitzer(Gonzaga)—President of Gonzaga University
 '74 Christine Hughes (Dartmouth)—VP and general counsel of Emerson College; counsel for Harvard and University of Washington
 '74 Marie Mookini (Stanford)—director of undergraduate admissions at Stanford and MBA Admissions at Stanford GSB
 '85 Arnold L. Longboy (Hamilton)—director of corporate relations at University of Chicago Booth School of Business

Law and business
 '31 Ronald B. Jamieson (Harvard)—Emeritus Lecturer of Law at University of Washington who certified 1960 United States presidential election for Kennedy after close recounts, cited in Bush v. Gore decision
 '33 Honorable Samuel P. King—Federal District Court Judge, Ninth Circuit; co-author, Broken Trust: Greed, Mismanagement and Political Manipulation at America's Largest Charitable Trust
 '48 Isaac Shapiro (Columbia)—Professor of Law at NYU and Columbia, Working but Poor: America's Contradiction, The Soviet Legal System
 '54 Robert M. Seto (Saint Louis U)—Emeritus Professor of Law at Regent University, federal patent and contracts judge
 '60 Evan L. Porteus (Claremont)—Endowed Professor of Business at Stanford, Foundations of Stochastic Inventory Theory
 '61 William Ouchi (Williams)—Endowed Professor of Business at UCLA, U Chicago, and Stanford, Theory Z and Making Schools Work, Chief of Staff of LA Mayor Richard Riordan
 '70 Andrea L. Peterson (Stanford)—Professor of Law at UC Berkeley
 '72 Linda Hamilton Krieger (Stanford)—Professor of Law at UC Berkeley and UH, Reinterpreting Disability Rights
 '74 Warren R. Loui (MIT)—Lecturer in Law at USC
 '82 Ian Haney-Lopez (Washington University in St. Louis)—Professor of Law at UC Berkeley, The Chicano Fight for Justice and The Legal Construction of Race

Science
 '33* Daniel F. Rex (MIT)—lieutenant commander at Office of Naval Research and NCAR, Mount Rex (Antarctica), Troposphere and Stratosphere (attended 1929–30)
 '42* John Killeen (Berkeley)—Emeritus Professor of Physics at UC Davis, founding director of National Energy Research Scientific Computing Center, Computational Methods for Kinetic Models of Magnetically Confined Plasmas (attended 1934–36)
 '46 Alison Kay (Mills)—malacologist and Fulbright scholar, Shells of Hawaii, Natural History of the Hawaiian Islands
 '54* Michael J. Holdaway (Yale)—Emeritus Professor of Geology at Southern Methodist University (attended 1943–48)
 '54 David W. Steadman (Harvard)—director of art and natural history museums, expert on birds and extinctions, e.g. IMAX film Galapagos
 '61 Herbert M. Austin (Grove City)—Professor of Marine Biology at William & Mary
 '64 Henry W. Lawrence, Jr. (Yale)—Professor of Geosciences at Edinboro University, City Trees
 '64 Lynn A. Sherretz (St. Olaf)—Chief Meteorologist at NOAA, Preliminary Study of Ocean Waves
 '66 J. Vann Bennett (Stanford)—Endowed Professor of Cell Biology, Biochemistry, and Neuroscience at Duke University
 '69 John W. Newport (Reed)—Professor of Cell Biology at UCSD
 '71 Marcy Uyenoyama (Stanford)—Professor of Biology at Duke
 '71 Howard W. Walker (UH)—Naval research chemist, seven patents on silicon processes
 '74 Shannon Crowell Atkinson (UH)—Professor of Marine Biology at U Alaska
 '74 William D. Thacker (MIT)—Professor of Physics at Saint Louis University
 '79 Laura S. L. Kong (Brown)—director of International Tsunami Information Center
 '79 Jonathan V. Selinger (Harvard)—Ohio Eminent Scholar and Professor of Chemical Physics at Kent State University, Assoc. Editor of Physical Review E

Logic, philosophy, mathematics, computing and engineering
 '59* Robert M. Harnish (Berkeley)—emeritus professor of philosophy at Arizona, twenty books, including Linguistics and Minds, Brains, Computers (attended 1954–57)
 '62 John Stephen Walther (MIT)—Hewlett Packard developer of CORDIC
 '65 Lynn Sumida Joy (Harvard/Radcliffe)—professor of philosophy at Notre Dame, book on Pierre Gassendi
 '69 John P. Richardson, Jr. (Harvard)—professor of philosophy at NYU, four books including Nietzsche
 '72 Bruce M. Ikenaga (MIT)—professor of mathematics at Case Western and Millersville University
 '72 Patricia Sullivan Kale (Berkeley)—Lawrence Livermore computer scientist, one of the many thousands of researchers involved in the International Human Genome Sequencing Consortium, contributing to final stages of the Human Genome Project
 '72 Michael C. Loui (Yale)—IEEE Fellow, professor of electrical and computer engineering at U Illinois, department chairman, graduate dean
 '72 Phillip M. Smith (Cornell)—IEEE Fellow, director and Global Engineering Fellow at BAE Systems
 '74 John Bear (New Mexico)—SRI International computational linguist
 '79 Ronald Loui (Harvard)—professor of computer science at Wash U, patent holder on packet processing hardware, Knowledge Representation and Defeasible Reasoning and Legal Knowledge and Information Systems
 '81 Robert C. Zak, Jr. (MIT)—patent holder on variable-refresh DRAM, other computing architectures
 '82 Chau Wen Tseng (Harvard)—professor of computer science at U Maryland, Languages and Compilers for Parallel Computing and Computational Biology and Bioinformatics
 '89 Herbie K. H. Lee III (Yale)—professor of statistics at UC Santa Cruz, Multiscale Modeling and Bayesian Nonparametrics

Social science

 '23 Laura M. Thompson (Mills)—anthropologist who taught at UNC, NC State, CCNY, CUNY, SIU, SFU, and UH; Malinowski Award and honorary LLD from Mills College, Toward a Science of Mankind and Secret of Culture, spouse of Indian Affairs commissioner John Collier
 '31* (?) Paul Linebarger, a.k.a. Cordwainer Smith—instructor in government at Harvard, Professor of Political Science at Duke and Johns Hopkins, fifteen books of science fiction, five nonfiction works including Psychological Warfare, Bronze Star, Army Major, helped form Office of War Information, advisor to CIA and John F. Kennedy, buried at Arlington National Cemetery (attended 1919–20)
 '43 Joyce Lebra Chapman (Minnesota)—Fulbright Scholar, Emerita Professor of History at Colorado, nine books on women and Asia 
 '62 Elise Kurashige Tipton (Wellesley)—professor and chair of Japanese studies, University of Sydney (Australia), Modern Japan, Japanese Police State, etc.
 '63 Jonathan M. Chu (Penn)—Fulbright Scholar, professor of history at U Massachusetts Boston, Neighbors, Friends, or Madmen
 '63 Christine Hamilton Rossell (UCLA)—endowed professor of political science, Boston University, five books, including School Desegregation in the 21st Century
 '65 Frederick E. Hoxie (Amherst)—endowed professor of history at U Illinois, twenty books on Native American peoples
 '66 Ellen Lenney (UH)—professor of psychology at U Maine Orono, early researcher on gender roles, oft cited, e.g., Women Don't Ask
 '68 E. Mark Cummings III (Johns Hopkins)—endowed chair in psychology at Notre Dame U, five books on child development
 '68 Patrick Vinton Kirch (Penn)—endowed professor of anthropology at UC Berkeley, elected to American Philosophical Society, nine books on oceanic and Polynesian prehistory
 '68 Patricia A. Roos (UC Davis)—professor of sociology at Rutgers, Explaining Women's Inroads into Male Occupations, and Gender and Work, VP of American Sociological Association
 '70 James J. Moore (Stanford)—professor of anthropology at UCSD
 '78 John Lie (Harvard)—endowed professor of sociology at UC Berkeley and U Illinois, dean of international studies, six books on Korea, Japan, and two textbooks on sociology
 '83 Jennifer Hickson Frankl (Princeton)—professor of economics at Williams College
 '84 Hugh C. Crethar (Oklahoma)—endowed associate professor of counseling and counseling psychology at Oklahoma State University and co-author of Inclusive Cultural Empathy
 '89 Adria L. Imada (Yale)—professor of ethnic studies at UCSD
 '89 Devah Pager (Wisconsin)—associate professor of sociology at Princeton University

Arts and humanities
 '55 Elizabeth Bennett Johns (Birmingham-Southern)—emerita professor of art history at Penn, Pitt, Maryland, and Holy Cross; Guggenheim Fellow; books on Thomas Eakins and Winslow Homer 
 '57 Arthur H. Okazaki (Swarthmore)—chair in fine arts and endowed professor of fine art photography at Tulane
 '60 Marilyn Wong-Gleysteen (Mt. Holyoke)—professor of art history at Columbia
 '68 Leslie K. Hankins (Duke)—professor of English at Cornell College, Virginia Woolf and the Arts 
 '73 Christin J. Mamiya (Yale)—endowed professor of art history at U Nebraska, edited an  edition of Gardner's Art Through the Ages
 '73 John B. Roeder (Harvard)—professor of music at U British Columbia (Canada)
 '76 Claire C. Sanford (California Arts)—metals faculty at Massachusetts College of Art
 '78 Gwen Griffith-Dickson (London)—chair in divinity and Gresham Professor of Divinity at Gresham College (UK), The Philosophy of Religion
 '82* Eric Selinger (Harvard)—professor of English at DePaul University
 '88* John W.I. Lee (Cornell)—associate professor of history at University of California, Santa Barbara, A Greek Army on the March: Soldiers and Survival in Xenophon's Anabasis
 '89 Valerie Weinstein (Harvard)—professor of German at University of Nevada, Reno

Civil rights leaders

 1859 Samuel C. Armstrong (Williams)—defeated Pickett's Charge at Battle of Gettysburg and commanded 8th U.S. Colored Troops, founding president of Hampton University and mentor of Booker T. Washington, honorary LLD from Harvard; subject of Educating the Disfranchised and Disinherited and Armstrong: A Biographical Study; Armstrong High School (Richmond, Virginia)
 '14 Elbert Tuttle (Cornell)—Chief Judge of US Court of Appeals 1954-68 appointed by Dwight Eisenhower, leader of the Fifth Circuit Four ruling on Southern desegregation cases, Presidential Medal of Freedom, honorary LLD from Harvard, subject of book Unlikely Heroes, inductee of International Civil Rights Walk of Fame (Atlanta), oldest serving federal judge at 98, brigadier general, Bronze Star, Purple Heart, and Legion of Merit, Elbert Parr Tuttle US Court of Appeals and Anti Defamation League's Elbert P. Tuttle Jurisprudence Award
 '29* John W. Gardner (Stanford)—subject of PBS documentary Uncommon American, Presidential Medal of Freedom, Secretary of HEW 1965-68 under Lyndon Johnson, launched Medicare, Common Cause, Corporation for Public Broadcasting, Urban Coalition, Model UN, and White House Fellows Program, Marine Corps Captain at Office of Strategic Services, head of Carnegie Foundation, Professor at Mount Holyoke College and Stanford, offered Robert F. Kennedy's vacated Senate seat (declined), author of seven books including speeches and papers of John F. Kennedy, John W. Gardner Center (Stanford University) and John W. Gardner Leadership Award (attended 1920–22)

Other elected representatives, government appointees, judges

United States Presidents
 '79 Barack Obama (Columbia)—44th President of the United States 2008–2016, Democratic US Senator from Illinois 2004-2008

US Senators

 1892 Hiram Bingham (Yale)—Republican US Senator from Connecticut 1924–33, discoverer of Machu Picchu, lecturer at Harvard and Princeton, Professor of History at Yale, spouse to the Tiffany fortune heiress, buried at Arlington National Cemetery, possible inspiration for Indiana Jones
 '90 Brian Schatz (Pomona)—Democratic US Senator from Hawaii, former Lieutenant Governor of Hawaii

US Congressional representatives

 1889 Jonah Kūhiō Kalanianaole (St. Matthews)—Hawaiian prince, Delegate to the US House of Representatives from Hawaii 1903–22
 1891* Henry Alexander Baldwin (MIT)—Republican Delegate to US Congress from Hawaii 1921–23 (attended 1886–88)
 '15 Joseph Farrington (Wisconsin)—Republican US Congressman from Hawaii 1943-54
 '39* Otis Pike (Princeton)—Democratic US Congressman from New York 1961–79, decorated USMC World War II pilot, known for work on environment, Pike Committee investigations of Richard Nixon's intelligence abuses, Otis G. Pike Wilderness Area (Long Island, New York) (attended 1927–29)
 '87 Charles Djou (Penn)—Republican US Congressman from Hawaii 2010-2011 (finishing Neil Abercrombie's term), and Major in the Army Reserve

Presidential appointees

 1864 Sanford Dole (Williams)—appointed first territorial governor of Hawaii and Federal Judge by William McKinley
 1881 Walter Frear (Yale)—appointed third territorial governor of Hawaii and Federal Judge by Theodore Roosevelt
 1896 William Castle, Jr. (Harvard)—Assistant Secretary of State and Ambassador to Japan under Calvin Coolidge, Undersecretary of State for Herbert Hoover, Harvard Board of Overseers
 1905 Lawrence M. Judd (Penn)—appointed seventh territorial governor of Hawaii by Herbert Hoover
 1908 William Charles Achi, Jr. (Stanford)—appointed territorial judge by Woodrow Wilson
 '33 Samuel Pailthorpe King (Yale)—appointed federal judge by Richard Nixon
 '47 John M. Steadman (Yale)—appointed judge of the District of Columbia Court of Appeals by Ronald Reagan
 '50 Alan Cooke Kay (Princeton)—appointed federal judge by Ronald Reagan
 '51 Elinor G. Constable (Wellesley)—US Ambassador to Kenya nominated by Ronald Reagan
 '62 Wendy Lee Gramm (Wellesley)—head of Commodity Futures Trading Commission for Ronald Reagan, his "favorite economist", disgraced Enron board member, spouse of Texas Republican senator Phil Gramm
 '62 Terrence O'Donnell (Air Force Academy)—deputy special assistant to Richard Nixon and special assistant to Gerald Ford, general counsel, Department of Defense, executive VP of Textron
 '64 Jonathan Jay Healy (Williams)—Massachusetts state legislator and State Commissioner of Food and Agriculture, appointed USDA regional director by Barack Obama
 '65 Robert G. Klein (Stanford)—justice of the Supreme Court of Hawaii, appointed a federal judge by Bill Clinton (withdrawn)
 '66 Nanci Langley (USC)—commissioner of the Postal Regulatory Commission, appointed by George W. Bush
 '68 Christopher Ryan Henry (Annapolis)—VP of Science Applications International Corporation and Principal Deputy Under Secretary of Defense for Policy for George W. Bush
 '75 Robert S. Silberman (Dartmouth)—Assistant Secretary of the Army (Manpower and Reserve Affairs) for George H. W. Bush, President of CalEnergy, CEO of Strayer Education

Local officials, other representatives and appointees

 1858 Albert Francis Judd (Yale)—Chief Justice of the Supreme Court of the Kingdom of Hawaii
 '23 Rhoda Valentine Lewis (Stanford)—inaugural (1959 statehood), and first female, justice on the Supreme Court of Hawaii
 '40 Charles Marsland (Tufts)—first elected Prosecuting Attorney of Honolulu, who served from 1980 to 1988
 '54 Patricia Hudson Birdsall—councilwoman, served as mayor of Temecula 1992 and 1997, Patricia H. Birdsall Sports Park (Temecula, California)
 '56* Jana Gilpin Haehl (San Francisco)—mayor of Corte Madera 1975–1979, environmental activist, member of Barbara Boxer's staff (attended 1947–49)
 '57 Henry S. Richmond (Williams)—US Consul General for Durban (Saudi Arabia) and Nagoya (Japan)
 '59* David A. Pabst (Dartmouth)—US Consul General for Osaka–Kobe (Japan) (attended 1954–56)
 '59 Stephen Yamashiro—Mayor of Hawaii County from 1992 to 2000
 '61 Peter J. Levinson (Brandeis)—US House of Representatives Legal Counsel, majority counsel during impeachment of Bill Clinton
 '62 Ronald E. Cox (West Point)—Chief Judge of the Washington Court of Appeals
 '75 Mary Fairhurst (Gonzaga)—justice of Washington State Supreme Court
 '76 David Jesmer (West Point)—US Embassy Military Attaché to Syria
 '77 Girard D. Lau (Stanford)—Solicitor General of Hawaii
 '79 Laura Thielen (University of Colorado)—Hawaii Senate representative, District 25; former chair of Hawaii Department of Land and Natural Resources
 '96 E. Peter Giambastiani III (Annapolis)—chief policy advisor to Republican US Congressman Jeff Miller from Florida

Military leaders and heroes

Army

 '05 Paul Withington (Harvard)—MD in World War I, Silver Star, Legion of Merit, and French Croix de guerre, U Wisconsin football coach and college quarterback
 '13 Farrant Louis Turner—lieutenant colonel, inaugural (May 1942) commander of the primarily Nisei Hawaiian Provisional Battalion, which was soon (June 1942) designated the U.S. 100th Infantry Battalion, unsuccessful Republican candidate for last (January 3 – August 21, 1959) pre-statehood Territorial delegate to US Congress representing Hawaii Territory's at-large congressional district
 '14* Edward W. Timberlake (West Point)—brigadier general, commanded 49th Anti-Aircraft Artillery Brigade, HQ Battery of 29th Infantry Division at Omaha Beach and Battle of the Bulge; had earlier been the inaugural (December 1942 – May 1943) commander of 400 Women's Army Auxiliary Corps members being trained with Coastal Anti-Aircraft units, a contributing factor to the July 1943 creation of the Women's Army Corps (attended 1910–13)
 '20* Russell "Red" Reeder, Jr. (West Point)—colonel and regiment leader at Utah Beach on D-Day, Distinguished Service Cross, West Point Distinguished Graduate, 35 books including The Long Gray Line (ghost writer), Born at Reveille (autobiography), and the "Clint Lane" stories (attended 1916–17)
 '22* Donald Prentice Booth (West Point)—High Commissioner of Okinawa 1958–61, lieutenant general, commander of Fourth United States Army, commander of Persian Gulf Command, buried at Arlington National Cemetery (attended 1912–17)
 '22* Walter M. Johnson (West Point)—brigadier general, commanded 117th infantry in Battle of Normandy, a unit known as "The Workhorse of the Western Front" and "Roosevelt's SS Troops" (reorganized as 278th Armored Cavalry Regiment) (attended 1911–15)
 '23 Archie Chun-Ming (Columbia)—World War II lieutenant colonel in Army Medical Corps, Bronze Star
 '28* Stephen O. Fuqua, Jr. (West Point)—brigadier general, director at Bureau of International Security Affairs, son of Stephen O. Fuqua, Chief of Infantry (attended 1921–24)
 '29 Alex Earl McKenzie (USC)—lieutenant colonel, commanded 442nd Regimental Combat Team (United States) Nisei, the Purple Heart Battalion
 '31 John Alexander Johnson (UH)—major, commanded company of U.S. 100th Infantry Battalion Nisei, killed in action at Cassino, John A. Johnson Hall (University of Hawaii)
 '33 Stanley R. Larsen (West Point)—lieutenant general, commanded 8th Infantry Division 1962–64, commanded I Field Force, Vietnam 1966–67, commanded 6th Army, deputy commander in chief and chief of staff U.S. Army Pacific at Fort Shafter, featured in book Touched with Fire: the Land War and author of US Army text, Allied Participation in Vietnam
 '34 Benjamin Franklin Dillingham II (Harvard)—lieutenant colonel, Bronze Star in World War II, unsuccessful Republican candidate for US Senator from Hawaii
 '35 Richard P. Scott (West Point)—brigadier general and commandant of Cadets, West Point US Military Academy
 '35 Francis B. Wai (UCLA)—Captain in World War II, posthumous Medal of Honor for actions in Battle of Leyte Gulf
 '38 George Cantlay (West Point)—deputy chairman of NATO Military Committee, lieutenant general, commanded 2nd Armored Division, Silver Star, Bronze Star, Purple Heart, four Legion of Merit, Distinguished Service Medal, and Defense Distinguished Service Medal
 '38 Frederick A. Schaefer, III (Cornell)—brigadier general, Distinguished Service Cross with 25th Infantry Division (Tropic Lightning) at Battle of Guadalcanal
 '38 Thurston Twigg-Smith (Yale)—lieutenant colonel in National Guard Artillery, Bronze Star, leading critic of Hawaiian sovereignty movement
 '42* George Patton IV (West Point)—major general, Distinguished Service Cross, Silver Star, Legion of Merit, served in Korean War and Vietnam War, son of General George S. Patton (attended 1935–37)
 '60 Peter E. Gleszer (West Point)—captain in Vietnam War, Bronze Star (heroism), 25th Infantry Division
 '64 Michael G. MacLaren (West Point)—colonel in Gulf War, The New Yorker'''s testifier of "turkey shoot"
 '67 Stephen D. Tom (Michigan)—major general United States Army Reserve, Chief of Staff United States Pacific Command Camp Smith
 '72 George L. Topic (Claremont)—major and Department of Army Inspector General, deputy director at Joint Chiefs of Staff
 '74 Thomas D. Farrell (UH)—colonel in Army Intelligence, Bronze Star and Legion of Merit during Operation Iraqi FreedomWatada wasn't asked to commit unlawful acts, by Col. Thomas D. Farrell (contains bio)
 '79 Mark E. Solomons (Chico)—lieutenant colonel who commanded 2nd Battalion, 8th Cavalry Regiment (the 2/8), of the 1st Brigade Combat Team, 1st Cavalry Division in Iraq, Bronze Star, Purple Heart, Legion of Merit, 5th-12th grade Punahou classmate of President Barack Obama

Navy

 '25* Frederick M. Reeder (Annapolis)—rear admiral, directed Naval Flight School (attended 1916–23)
 '29* Gordon Chung-Hoon (Annapolis)—rear admiral,  survivor, commanded World War II destroyer , Silver Star and Navy Cross, destroyer , Sports Illustrated featured football star (attended 1923–28)
 '58 Robert T. Guard (USC)—commanded swiftboat and  aggressive minesweeper, Bronze Star
 '65 Christopher H. Johnson (Stanford)—commanded  escort frigate
 '69 Thomas G. Kyle (Stanford)—commanded  attack submarine, investigated Ehime Maru and USS Greeneville collision
 '76 Dennis A. Schulz (Marquette)—commanded Tactical Air Group One
 '77 Thomas H. Copeman III (Creighton)—rear admiral, commanded , Deputy Chief of Staff for Operations, Training, and Readiness, appointed to reform the internment camp at Guantanamo Bay
 '77 Alma M. Grocki (Annapolis)—admiral, member of the 2nd class at the Naval Academy to admit women
 '79 Paul Siegrist (Annapolis)—commander of ballistic missile submarine  and program manager for Navy unmanned maritime (undersea and surface) vehicles

Marines
 '37 Ross T. Dwyer (Stanford)—major general, commanded 1st Marine Division and I Marine Amphibious Force, USMC Aide to Secretary of the Navy, Distinguished Service Medal, Legion of Merit, Bronze Star
 '61 Gene Smedley McMullen (Penn State)—lieutenant killed in action in the Vietnam War
 '63* Benjamin F. Dillingham, III (Harvard)—leading gay and human rights benefactor in San Diego, Bronze Star for service in Vietnam with the U.S. Marine Corps (attended '53–59)

Air Force

 '28 Benjamin Jepson Webster (West Point)—lieutenant general, commander of Allied Airforces, Southern Europe (AIRSOUTH)
 '30 Charles Barnard Stewart (West Point)—brigadier general, Legion of Merit, vice commander of Air Force Special Weapons Center (Kirtland Air Force Base), director at Atomic Energy Commission
 '35* William Brewster Morgan (Columbia)—Eagle Squadron pilot, subject of movie, commander of Hawaii National Guard (attended 1925–30)334th Eagle Squadron 
 '40* Ben Cassiday, Jr. (West Point)—brigadier general and commandant of AFROTC, Silver Star (attended 1934–36)
 '61 Michael H. Tice (Oregon)—major general, commanded 154th Wing
 '66* Gregory S. Martin (Air Force Academy)—general and commander at Wright-Patterson AFB, commander of Allied Airforces, Northern Europe (AIRNORTH); Defense Distinguished Service Medal, Distinguished Service Medal, Defense Superior Service Medal, Legion of Merit, Distinguished Flying Cross (attended 1962–65)
 '72 Gregory B. Gardner (UH)—Air National Guard major general, Kansas National Guard adjutant general and Director of Homeland Security for Kansas, commanded B1 bomber 184th Wing

Entertainment

Musicians and composers

 '12 Robert Alexander Anderson (Cornell)—World War I downed pilot, subject of film The Dawn Patrol, composer of Hawaiian standards "Mele Kalikimaka", "Lovely Hula Hands"
 '52* Dave Guard (Stanford)—Kingston Trio founder (attended 1946–51)
 '52 Bob Shane (Menlo)—Kingston Trio founding guitarist
 '59 Robin Luke (Pepperdine)—early rockabilly singer, Rockabilly Hall of Fame, "Susie Darlin'" was a No. 5 hit, then Professor and Head of Marketing, Southwest Missouri State University
 '62 Bruce Broughton—film composer (Silverado, Tombstone, The Rescuers Down Under) and 10-time Emmy-winner for TV themes (JAG, Tiny Toon Adventures) and series (Hawaii Five-O, Dallas, How the West Was Won)
 '67 Henry "Kapono" Ka'aihue—singer-songwriter of Cecilio & Kapono
 '71 Audy Kimura (Hawaii)—popular composer, singer and music producer in Hawaii and Japan, winner of eight Na Hoku Hanohano awards
 '77 Conrad Herwig (N Texas State)—Grammy Award-nominated jazz trombonist, recorded 17 albums as leader, Professor of Jazz at Rutgers
 '97 Tim Fagan—Indie pop rock artist formerly with Colbie Caillat, co-wrote Grammy-winning song "Lucky"
 '00 melody.—Japanese pop artist with three top ten albums
 '00 Yasmeen Sulieman—recording artist with two top-100 R&B hits

Broadway, stage, and dance performers

 '33* Jean Erdman (Sarah Lawrence)—one of Martha Graham's first dancers, founded her own NYC dance company; spouse of religion and mythology author Joseph Campbell (attended 1921–32)
 '68 Rap Reiplinger—Emmy-winning comedian
 '69 Bonnie Oda Homsey (Juilliard)—principal dancer for Martha Graham, co-founder of LA-based American Repertory Dance Company, Perspectives of a Healthy Dancer, '76 Willy Falk Harvard)—Tony Award nominee for Miss Saigon; Marius in Les Misérables on Broadway
 '81 Ann Harada (Brown)—original cast main actress, Tony Award-winning Avenue Q '86 Carrie Ann Inaba (Irvine)—choreographer and judge, Dancing with the Stars, actress, Austin Powers in Goldmember, Flygirl dancer on In Living Color '87 Rachel Factor, née Christine Horii (Colorado)—Broadway actress, Rockettes dancer, one person show JAP '96 Amanda Schull (Indiana)—lead actress in Center Stage, dancer for San Francisco Ballet
 '98 Jacqueline Dowsett (Southern Methodist)—dancer, Radio City Music Hall Rockettes

TV and film performers

 '25* Joan Blondell (North Texas)—leading actress for 52 years in films and on stage, Hollywood Walk of Fame star, nominated for Academy Award best supporting actress in 1951 (attended 1914–15)
 '27 Buster Crabbe (USC)—athlete and leading actor, Tarzan, Flash Gordon, and Buck Rogers 1933-50
 '54 Al Harrington (Stanford)—athlete and actor, Hawaii Five-O '66 Susan Blakely (UTEP)—winner of Hollywood Foreign Press Association Golden Globe Award 1976 Best Dramatic Actress Rich Man, Poor Man, twice nominated for the Emmy Award as Best Dramatic Actress, 1976–77, Rich Man, Poor Man '66 Gerry Lopez (UH)—surfer and main actor, Subotai in Conan the Barbarian '79 Teri Ann Linn (Pepperdine)—Miss Hawaii 1981, singer and main actress, Kristen Forrester Dominguez in The Bold and the Beautiful, gold CD Teri on the European charts
 '80 Kelly Preston, née Kelly Smith (also Kelly Palzis)—leading actress, 50+ films including For Love of the Game, Jerry Maguire, Addicted to Love, Twins, Only You, Waiting to Exhale; spouse of actor John Travolta
 '82 Scott Coffey—actor, Tank Girl, Mulholland Drive, Ferris Bueller's Day Off, Wayne's World 2, male lead in Shag '91 Matt Corboy (Colorado State)—actor, The Shield, The Descendants '95 Sarah Wayne Callies (Dartmouth)—actress, female lead in Prison Break, female lead in The Walking Dead '96 Amanda Schull (Indiana) - actress, "One Tree Hill", "Suits", "Pretty Little Liars", and "12 Monkeys"
 '01 Jason Tam—actor, Markko Rivera on One Life to Live and Beyond the Break '06 Asia Ray Smith—actress, Sierra Hoffman on The Young and the RestlessOther entertainment industry producers
 '24 Mary Louise Love Schneeberger (Sorbonne)—Cine Golden Eagle Award winner for A Child's Garden of Verses 1975
 '26 J. Ken Peterson (Washington)—Disney animator and supervisor 1936–83, Snow White, 101 Dalmatians, Sleeping Beauty, The Sword in the Stone '35* Buck Henshaw (Stanford)—set decorator 1950–1987, The George Burns and Gracie Allen Show, The Twilight Zone, Black Widow (attended 1925–34)
 '38 John Kneubuhl (Yale)—writer for Wild, Wild, West, Star Trek, Mannix, The Fugitive, Hawaii Five-O, Ironside, Gunsmoke, Wagon Train '53 Allan Burns (Oregon)—6-time Emmy Award-winning writer and creator 1961–96, The Munsters, Get Smart, Mary Tyler Moore Show, Rocky and Bullwinkle, and the Cap'n Crunch cereal character, animator of George of the Jungle, nominated for Oscar
 '69 Edgy Lee (SF Art)—independent filmmaker

 '78 Don King (Stanford)—surfing photographer and cinematographer
 '80 Rod Lurie (West Point)—creator of Commander in Chief, Line of Fire, portraying the first Jewish U.S. president and the first woman U.S. President
 '80* Kevin McCollum (Cincinnati)—Broadway producer of Tony Award-winning Rent and Avenue Q, owner of production company claiming five Tony Awards, thirteen nominations, and Pulitzer Prize for Drama (attended 1971–76)
 '83* Iris Yamashita (UCSD)—nominated for best original screenplay for Letters from Iwo Jima (attended 1974–1976)
 '85 Scott Moore (Colorado)—nominated for BAFTA Award for best original screenplay for The Hangover, co-wrote and -directed Bad Moms '88 Albert Cheng—Emmy award for ABC streaming video internet site
 '94 Kaui Hart Hemmings (Colorado)—writer of The Descendants '97 David Nakayama—concept and comic book artist

Business leaders and philanthropists
Major philanthropists

 '33 Maude (Ackerman) Woods Wodehouse (UCLA)—philanthropist, America's #14 most-generous donor in 2003 according to Chronicle of Philanthropy ($80M in 2003)
 '39 Charles Gates, Jr. (MIT)—owner of Gates Rubber Company and Gates Corporation (owner of Learjet), often listed on Forbes 400, e.g., #186 in 1999, #209 in 2002, #222 in 2003, philanthropist through Gates Family Foundation ($147M over 60 years)
 '65* James C. Kennedy (Denver)—director of Cox Enterprises and principal heir of the Barbara Cox Anthony estate, #49 in 2008 on Forbes 400, Atlanta philanthropist of the year 2003, conservation and education donor (attended '55-61)
 '76 Steve Case (Williams)—co-founder and CEO of America Online and philanthropist, America's #19 most generous donor in 1999 according to Chronicle of Philanthropy ($40M in 1999), appointed to the Presidential Council on Jobs and Competitiveness
 '84* Pierre Omidyar (Tufts)—founder of eBay and philanthropist, America's #20 in 2002, #13 in 2003, #7 in 2004, #9 in 2005, and #29 most-generous donor in 2006 according to Chronicle of Philanthropy ($403M, 2002–06), appointed to the Presidential Commission on White House Fellows (attended '79-81)

Other charitable and development business leaders
 '34 Richard Tam (Stanford)—Las Vegas developer, honorary LLD from UNLV, Richard Tam Alumni Center (UNLV) named for him
 '52 Hugh T. Murphy (Berkeley)—director at IRRI, Trustee of AsiaRice USA, development banker at World Bank
 '52 John Bowman O'Donnell (Stanford)—decorated USAID official, nonprofit fundraising
 '56* W. Robert Warne (Princeton)—president of Korea Economic Institute of America (attended 1953–55)
 '63 Christopher T. Prukop (Middelbury)—leadership gifts officer, World Society for the Protection of Animals
 '65 Erik Holtedahl (Oslo)—chairman of Scanteam, Norwegian NGO international development consultants
 '67 Suzanne M. Sato (Harvard/Radcliffe)—VP of AT&T Foundation and VP for Arts and Culture at Rockefeller FoundationGrantmakers in the Arts: Library Documents: After September 11 
 '86 Melinda Tuan (Harvard)—senior fellow at Rockefeller Philanthropy Advisors

Other founders and CEOs
 '67 Jeff Hakman—world surfing champion and founder of Quiksilver in the U.S. and in Europe
 '77 David T. Hamamoto (Stanford)—partner of Goldman Sachs and CEO of Northstar Capital, e.g., Morgans Hotel Group
 '77 Michael W. Rogers (Berkeley)—CEO of Indevus, e.g. Histrelin, NASDAQ Biotechnology Index, director of pSividia Limited
 '78 C. Malcolm Holland (Southern Methodist)—CEO of Colonial Bank Texas Region
 '79 Peter Gordon (UCLA)—President of John Hancock Financial Group
 '85 Baron R. Ah Moo (Cornell)—CEO of Indochina Hotels and Resorts

Other business leaders
 '77 Charles (Chuck) Yort (Princeton)—VP of Plantronics, Venturi Wireless and Polyfuel
 '82 Janice L. Vorfeld (Dartmouth)—senior VP at Charles Schwab

Cultural notables
Authors, editors, and journalists

 '63 David Boynton (UCSB)—photographer, naturalist, educator and author of Kauai Days, Kauai, NaPali: Images of Kauai's Northwest Shore, and several other photographic essays about Hawaii
 '63 Susanna Moore—author of My Old Sweetheart, The Whiteness of Bones, Sleeping Beauties, In The Cut, One Last Look, I Myself Have Seen It: The Myth of Hawai'i, The Big Girls, The Life of Objects '65 Kathleen Norris (Bennington)—best-selling Christian spiritual poet and essayist, Dakota: A Spiritual Geography '71 Richard H.P. Sia (Harvard)—associate editor, International Consortium of Investigative Journalists; senior editor, managing editor of National Journal; former defense correspondent at the Baltimore Sun '72 David Ranada (Harvard)—editor of Stereo Review and High Fidelity '74 Shannon Brownlee (Santa Cruz)—journalist, associate editor of U.S. News & World Report, Science writing award
 '74 Robert S. Sandla (UH)—editor in chief, Symphony magazine and Stagebill (see Playbill)
 '78* Gale Pryor (Cornell)—author of Nursing Mother, Working Mother, co-author of an edition of Nursing your Baby with mother Karen Pryor (attended 1972–76)
 '83 Nora Okja Keller (Hawaii)—Pushcart Prize, 1995, for "Mother Tongue", from Comfort Woman; American Book Award, 1998
 '85 Allegra Goodman (Harvard)—author of award-winning The Family Markowitz '91 Nancy Cordes, née Weiner (Penn)—CBS and ABC NY and Washington, D.C. news correspondent
 '92 Hanya Yanagihara (Smith)—author, writer, journalist
 '98 Emily Chang (Harvard University)—broadcast journalist
'11 Tae Keller—author of The Science of Breakable Things and 2021 Newbery Medal winner When You Trap A TigerOther cultural notables

 1875* Lorrin A. Thurston—leader of the overthrow of the Kingdom of Hawaii, owner of Honolulu Advertiser, early player of baseball with Cartwrights
 1883* Sun Yat-Sen—founding president of the Republic of China, founder of the Kuomintang (attended 1882–83)
 '34 Stanley Livingston, Jr. (Yale)—America's Cup Hall of Fame inductor, and recipient of the Silver Star
 '55* Ron Jacobs—co-creator of American Top 40
 '58 Jerry Berman (Berkeley)—chief legislative counsel of ACLU, director of Electronic Frontier Foundation and co-founder of Center for Democracy and Technology
 '62 Charles L. Veach (Air Force Academy)—astronaut, two shuttle missions; Distinguished Flying Cross, Purple Heart, Air Force Commendation Medal
 '65 Charlie Wedemeyer (Michigan State)—medical survivor celebrated in Emmy Award-winning film, Quiet Victory '70 Arthur Johnsen—artist and painter of Hawaiiana, including The Goddess Pele '72 Nainoa Thompson (UH)—navigator of the Hōkūlea establishing Polynesian diaspora, chairman of Board of Trustees, Kamehameha Schools
 '75 Lindy Vivas (UCLA)—Fresno State women's volleyball coach, plaintiff awarded largest compensation for retaliation under Title IX discrimination statute
 '76 Judi Andersen—Miss Hawaii, Miss USA, and runner-up Miss Universe
 '79 Quentin Kawananakoa (USC)—a claimant to head of Hawaiian kingdom, Hawaii state representative, Republican minority leader
 '86 Richard Y. Lee (Yale)—college defensive tackle, internet executive, casualty of September 11, 2001 attacks
 '87 Heather Malia Ho (Boston)—executive pastry chef at Windows on the World, North Tower 107th Floor, casualty of September 11, 2001 attacks
 '89* Brook Mahealani Lee—Miss Hawaii USA and Miss Universe 1997 (attended 1981–1987)
 '95 Candes Gentry (UH)—Miss Hawaii USA 1999
 '95 Kealoha (MIT)—performance poet (Hawaii's first poet laureate and National Poetry Slam Legend), storyteller, and Hawaii's SlamMaster
 '96* Ehren Watada (HPU)—army lieutenant involved in Iraq War court-martial mistrial over command responsibility (attended 199?-93)
 '96* Lena Yada—professional wrestler and actress (attended 1992–1996)
 '02* Kiwi Camara (HPU)—youngest matriculate of Harvard Law School, catalyst for racial scandal (attended 1990-95?)

Notable former faculty and staff
 Nick Bozanic—former English teacher, winner of Anhinga Prize for Poetry for The Long Drive Home Edward Lane-Reticker—former Latin and Greek teacher, directed banking and law centers at Boston University
 Tom Haine—coach, 1968 US Olympic volleyball captain
 Henry Wells Lawrence—former computing teacher, commanded 339th Fighter Squadron in World War II, one of the first US pilots in the air during Attack on Pearl Harbor; Distinguished Flying Cross and Purple HeartObituaries , Honolulu Star Bulletin, May 16, 2001Pearl Harbor's Lost P-36's, by David Aiken, Flight Journal, Sep/October 2002. 
 Duncan Macdonald—coach, 1976 Olympian
 Loye H. Miller, former biology instructor, paleontologist
 Queenie B. Mills—former director of kindergarten, University of Illinois Head of Human Development Department, helped design the Head Start Program and programs for animal visits to nursing home residents
 Susan Tolman Mills—former principal, founder of Mills College
 Barbara Perry—1968 teacher, Olympian
 Sharon Peterson—coach, 1964, 1968 Olympian
 Lillian "Pokey" Watson (Richardson)—trustee, 1964 Olympic gold medalist (youngest female US gold in swimming), 1968 gold medalist
 Willard Warch—former schoolmaster, professor of music at Oberlin College, author of texts such as Music for Study and Beethoven's Use of Intermediate Keys, World War II Army Air Corps Band

References

Additional references
The main reference for this page is the Punahou School Alumni Directory 1841-1991'' Harris Publishing, New York, 1991.

External links

 
Lists of American people by school affiliation
Lists of people from Hawaii